Douglass Independent School District is a public school district based in the community of Douglass, Texas (USA).

Douglass ISD has one school that serves students in grades Kindergarten though twelve.

In 2009, the school district was rated "recognized" by the Texas Education Agency.

The Douglass Indians boys' basketball team reached the UIL 2012-2013 1A Division 2 basketball State Finals, losing to the Roxton Lions in the finals. It was the team's first appearance in the State Tournament.
The Douglass Indians Boys' Baseball Team went 33-1 in the 2014 season, winning the state tournament to receive their first Baseball State Championship.

The 2014 girls' Cross Country Team won the State Runner up Title

References

External links
 Douglass ISD

School districts in Nacogdoches County, Texas